Limoeiro de Anadia is a municipality located in the Brazilian state of Alagoas. Its population is 28,771 (2020) and its area is 316 km².

References

Municipalities in Alagoas